The Dornier Aerodyne (also referred to as "Lippisch-Dornier Aerodyne") was a wingless VTOL unmanned aircraft. Conceived by Alexander Lippisch, it was developed and built by Dornier on behalf of the Federal German Ministry of Defence (BMVg). Lippisch was part of the team. The first flight took place on 18 September 1972. The development ended on 30 November 1972 after successful hovering-flight testing with the aircraft. Experimentation did not continue due to lack of interest by the Bundeswehr (German Armed Forces).

Description
The principle behind the Aerodyne is the combination of lift and thrust production in a single construction unit and flow channel, i.e. a ducted fan. Flaps at the end of the fan divert the outflowing air to produce lift, thrust, or a combination of both. As a result, the Aerodyne could be steered and flown in the entire range between hovering and full-forward flight.

For forward flight, the Aerodyne had a conventional tail unit at the rear, which allowed for pitch and yaw control. The equipment was unmanned and operated by remote control.

It was intended to be a land- or ship-supported drone (UAV) for aerial reconnaissance.

Specifications
Length: 
Width: 
Fan Diameter: 
Engine: 1 MTU 6022 A-3, 
Total Weight:

References

"Eine Dokumentation zur Geschichte des Hauses Dornier", Ed. Dornier GmbH, 1983, bound, 214 pp.
Patents US2918230; US2918233.

1970s German experimental aircraft
Tailsitter aircraft
Aerodyne
Aircraft first flown in 1972
Ducted fan-powered aircraft